Qualification for the 2008 Little League World Series took place in eight United States regions and eight international regions in July and August 2008.

One change from the 2007 Qualification is the realignment of the former EMEA (Europe, Middle East, and Africa) and Transatlantic regions.  Instead of the aforementioned regions (which chiefly were divided by native-born players and US/Canadian/Japanese expatriates, respectively), teams will now be entered by geography: one for Europe, another for the Middle East and Africa, with both native-born and children of expatriates on the same team from a given country.

United States

Great Lakes

Mid-Atlantic

Midwest

Note: The Dakotas are organized into a single Little League district, which was won by a South Dakota team.

New England

Northwest

Southeast

Southwest

West

International

Asia-Pacific

Canada

Caribbean

Europe

Japan

Latin America

Mexico

Phase 1

Phase 2

Phase 3

Middle East-Africa

External links

2008 Little League World Series